The 5th Guards Armoured Brigade was an armoured brigade of the British Army, a component unit of the Guards Armoured Division, that served in the Second World War in North-west Europe from June 1944 until May 1945.

History

This brigade was converted from the 20th Infantry Brigade (Guards) on 15 September 1941. It was stationed in the United Kingdom on training and home defence duties, anticipating a potential German invasion. The brigade remained in the United Kingdom until 30 June 1944 when it arrived in Normandy with the rest of the Guards Armoured Division as part of Operation Overlord. The brigade served throughout the North West Europe Campaign. On 12 June 1945 it was converted to the 5th Guards Brigade.

Commanders
 Brig. W.A.F.L. Fox-Pitt
 Lieut. Col. R. Myddleton
 Brig. C.M. Dillwyn-Venables-Llewelyn
 Brig. Norman Wilmshurst Gwatkin 1943–45

Component Units
Structure upon formation in 1941:

 Headquarters
 1st Battalion, Coldstream Guards - Armoured
 1st Battalion, Grenadier Guards - Motorized Infantry
 2nd Battalion, Grenadier Guards - Armoured
 2nd Battalion, Irish Guards - Armoured

See also

 British Armoured formations of World War II
 List of British brigades of the Second World War

References

External links
 
 

Armoured brigades of the British Army in World War II
Military units and formations established in 1941
Guards Division (United Kingdom)
Military units and formations disestablished in 1945